Bombira is a locality in New South Wales, Australia.

References

Localities in New South Wales
Towns in the Central West (New South Wales)